Deniz Sığa (born 1 February 1989) is a Turkish footballer who plays as a forward for OSC Bremerhaven.

References

External links
 
 Profile at TFF

1989 births
Living people
People from Niğde
Turkish footballers
Turkey youth international footballers
Association football forwards
1. FC Magdeburg players
FC Rot-Weiß Erfurt players
Borussia Neunkirchen players
Pendikspor footballers
Siirtspor footballers
Gölcükspor footballers
24 Erzincanspor footballers
Yimpaş Yozgatspor footballers
FSV Salmrohr players
OSC Bremerhaven players
3. Liga players
Regionalliga players
TFF Second League players
Turkish expatriate footballers
Turkish expatriate sportspeople in Germany
Expatriate footballers in Germany